Garikoitz Azkue Laso (born 13 April 1972) is a Spanish rower. He competed in the men's eight event at the 1992 Summer Olympics.

References

1972 births
Living people
Spanish male rowers
Olympic rowers of Spain
Rowers at the 1992 Summer Olympics
Sportspeople from San Sebastián
Rowers from the Basque Country (autonomous community)